Melbourne North Province was an electorate of the Victorian Legislative Council until 2006. It was abolished from the 2006 state election in the wake of the Bracks Labor government's reform of the Legislative Council.

Members for Melbourne North Province

Election results

References
 http://www.parliament.vic.gov.au/re-member/bioregsearch.cfm

Former electoral provinces of Victoria (Australia)
1904 establishments in Australia
2006 disestablishments in Australia